Ezra Sued (7 June 1923 – 21 August 2011) was an Argentine international  football striker.

Career
Born in Once, Buenos Aires, Sued began playing club football for local side Racing Club de Avellaneda. He spent his entire professional career with the club, playing from 1943 until 1954 and winning the Argentine championship three times. He played in 308 matches and scored 47 goals for the club.

Sued made six appearances and scored two goals for the Argentina national football team, appearing in the 1946 and 1947 South American Championships.

He died on 21 August 2011 from an infection at the age of 88.

References

External links
 Ezra Sued at BDFA.com.ar 

1923 births
2011 deaths
Argentine footballers
Argentina international footballers
Jewish footballers
Jewish Argentine sportspeople
Argentine Jews
Argentine Primera División players
Racing Club de Avellaneda footballers
Copa América-winning players
Argentine people of Bulgarian-Jewish descent
Association football forwards